Marwah Rizqy is a Canadian politician, who was elected to the National Assembly of Quebec in the 2018 provincial election. She represents the electoral district of Saint-Laurent as a member of the Quebec Liberal Party.

Prior to her election, she was a professor of tax law at the University of Sherbrooke.

Rizqy previously ran for the Liberal Party of Canada in the 2015 Canadian federal election in the riding of Hochelaga, finishing behind New Democratic Party incumbent Marjolaine Boutin-Sweet by 500 votes. In 2017, Rizqy sought the Liberal nomination for the Saint-Laurent by-election caused by the resignation of Stéphane Dion. Rizqy was defeated for the nomination by eventual winner Emmanuella Lambropoulos.

Personal life
In June 2021, Riqzy announced her upcoming wedding to fellow Assembly member Greg Kelley; this is the first marriage between two sitting members of the Assembly. She gave birth to their first child, Gabriel, on October 6, 2022.

Electoral record

References

Living people
Canadian women lawyers
Quebec Liberal Party MNAs
Liberal Party of Canada candidates for the Canadian House of Commons
21st-century Canadian politicians
Politicians from Montreal
Women MNAs in Quebec
Université de Sherbrooke alumni
Academic staff of the Université de Sherbrooke
University of Florida alumni
Lawyers from Montreal
New York (state) lawyers
Tax lawyers
Quebec candidates for Member of Parliament
21st-century Canadian women politicians
1985 births